Jaswant Singh Rajput (c. 1926 – 28 January 2015) was an Indian field hockey player who played as a center-half in the Indian team. At the club level, he played for Bhowanipore and Mohun Bagan. Known for his dribbling skills and ball control, he won gold medals with the Indian team at the 1948 and 1952 Summer Olympics.

Career
Singh began playing as a left-half during his school days in Delhi, and represented the Delhi University at the time. Spotted by the selectors, he was named in the Indian team for the 1948 Summer Olympics, and went on to win the gold medal. He won the gold medal with the team again at the 1952 Olympics in Helsinki. At the club level, he played for Bhowanipore before moving to Mohun Bagan in 1952. With Bagan, he won the Beighton Cup.

References

External links
 
 

1920s births
2015 deaths
Field hockey players from Delhi
Field hockey players from Kolkata
Olympic field hockey players of India
Field hockey players at the 1948 Summer Olympics
Field hockey players at the 1952 Summer Olympics
Indian male field hockey players
Olympic gold medalists for India
Olympic medalists in field hockey
Medalists at the 1952 Summer Olympics
Medalists at the 1948 Summer Olympics